Leszczyna may refer to:
Leszczyna, Lower Silesian Voivodeship, Poland, in the south-west
Leszczyna, Lublin Voivodeship, Poland, in the east
Leszczyna, Lesser Poland Voivodeship, Poland, in the south
Leszczyna, Masovian Voivodeship, Poland, in the east-central
Leszczyna, Warmian-Masurian Voivodeship, Poland, in the north